Nyta Dover (17 May 1927 – 13 April 1998) was a Swiss actress. She appeared in more than thirty films from 1948 to 1959.

Selected filmography

References

External links 

1927 births
1998 deaths
Swiss film actresses